Joshua John Devine (born 9 July 1991) is an English session drummer, singer, and songwriter. He is known for being the live drummer of One Direction.

Personal life
Devine grew up in Bournemouth, England, but later moved to The Midlands during secondary school. Devine's father was in an '80s rock band growing up, which inspired his musical interests at a young age. Devine began experimenting with drumming at the age of three years, and later got gifted his first drum set from his parents on his fourth birthday.

Career

Music
In 2011, Devine found out about the audition opportunity for One Direction through a friend of his on Facebook. He was selected on the very first audition, and has since performed with them on every show.

Devine has collaborated with many other acts as well as working as a session drummer. Amongst them, a cover of "Uptown Funk" by Mark Ronson and Bruno Mars alongside Lia Marie Johnson, Jamieboy, and Josh Golden. He later went on to collaborate with singer & songwriter Ollie Green to create the Through The Fire EP in August 2015. 

On 1 January 2017 Josh announced the beginning of his new band, Evaride, along with guitarist Hayden Maringer and singer Sean Michael Murray. They released their debut single later that year.

In May 2018 he formed ZFG with guitarist Trev Lukather, vocalist Jules Galli and bassist Sam Porcaro. ZFG debuted with their own material in 2019 and announced some live dates supporting The Winery Dogs in USA and headlining in Europe. In early 2020 the group was renamed "Levara" and Porcaro left the group. Their debut album was launched on May 14, 2021.

Discography

Extended plays

Music videos

References

External links

English pop singers
English pop rock singers
English rock drummers
English drummers
British male drummers
1991 births
English songwriters
Living people
21st-century English singers
21st-century drummers
21st-century British male singers
British male songwriters